This article explains the positive and negative impacts to adolescents’ exposure to social media.

Research

Positive impacts

Social media may positively affect adolescents by promoting a feeling of inclusion, providing greater access to more friends, and enhancing romantic relationships. Social media allows people to communicate with other people, no matter the distance between them.  Some adolescents with social and emotional issues feel more included with social media and online activities. Social media can give people a sense of belonging which can lead to an increase in identity development. Adolescents that post pictures on social media can look back on their memories, and their positive emotions can be related to a sense of their true identity. Additionally, social media provide a way to communicate with friends and family when alone.

Adolescents who use social media tend to be more outgoing and interact more with others online and in person. According to Newport Academy, teens who spend more time on non-screen activities, such as sports, exercise, in-person social interaction, or any other in-person activities are less likely to report any mental issues, such as anxiety or depression. Social media provide adolescents within the United States the ability to connect with people from other countries. Being involved in social media typically improves communication skills, social connections, and technical skills. Furthermore, adolescents who are students can use social media to seek academic help. The appropriate usage of social media has developed favorable academic environments for both, the students and the teaching faculty, offering the potential benefits in the process of learning information.

According to research conducted by Dr. John Gilmour and his coauthors, social media exposure, specifically Facebook, has allowed the general population to have positive interactions and gain social support from their family and friends, which in turn benefits their overall well-being. Social support is defined as the extent to which an individual feels a sense of value and belongingness to a social group. Although several studies have found that general Facebook use has a negative impact on mental health, Facebook use has a variety of positive mental health outcomes when used to seek and provide social support. Gilmour and his research team used academic databases and located 27 articles related to individuals’ use of Facebook as a mechanism for social support. The articles did not consider adolescents and adults separately, but rather focused on the general population of Facebook users.

After analyzing all 27 articles, the researchers concluded that the more active a person is on Facebook, the greater the opportunities for receiving social support. Furthermore, higher levels of Facebook-based social support predicted greater positive mental health outcomes. These outcomes include, but are not limited to, a decrease in depression, anxiety, and loneliness, as well as an increase in general psychological well-being.

Focusing on adolescents, J. Pouwels and her coauthors conducted a 3-week study to determine whether social media has a positive impact on adolescents’ close friendships, characterized by supportiveness, responsiveness, and accessibility. A total of 387 adolescents who were active on Instagram, WhatsApp, and Snapchat completed a 2-minute survey six times per day. They reported the amount of time they spent on these three social media platforms, as well as their momentary experiences of friendship closeness. Findings suggested that the more time spent on Instagram and WhatsApp, the higher degree of friendship closeness as reported on the surveys.  

Similar results were found in a study conducted by Dr. Lauren Shapiro and Dr. Gayla Margolin. Their study found that social media has a positive impact on the development of adolescents’ social relationships. The researchers administered self-report questionnaires to gather these findings. Their results suggest that social networking sites make it easier for adolescents to communicate and share feelings and experiences because it is less threatening than face-to-face interactions. In addition, online communications were found to lead to closer, high-quality friendships among adolescents.

As discovered by this study, social networking sites can also foster identity development for adolescents. Specifically, social media provides many opportunities for self-disclosure, which researchers believe plays a role in identity development. Adolescents that participated in the study reported being able to learn more about themselves through using social media.

Negative impacts

Many research studies have also analyzed the negative effects of social media on adolescents’ mental health, however. In the same study conducted by Dr. Shapiro and Dr. Margolin, they discovered that social networking sites, such as Facebook, make it easier for adolescents to compare themselves to their peers. Based on the results of this research study, social comparison can have a strong negative impact on adolescents’ self-esteem. Self-report surveys revealed that the more time adolescents spent on Facebook, the more they believed others were better off or happier than themselves. The results show that social media exposure was positively associated with tobacco and alcohol use and that deviant peer affiliation significantly mediated this relationship. 

Along with accomplishments and happiness, physical attractiveness is also a significant aspect of social comparison. Preadolescence is a period when children start to become exposed to social media and is also a period when they start to develop body image concerns and depression. Since individuals posting on social media tend to only present the best version of themselves online, research has shown that this can cause adolescents to perceive others as more attractive than themselves. In the study administered by Dr. Shapiro and Dr. Margolin, female adolescents reported having a more negative body image after looking at beautiful photos of other women versus looking at less attractive photos on social media.

Young adults also seem to experience higher symptoms of anxiety because of attempting to keep up with social media’s warped beauty standards. Hawes et al. (2020) found that increased social media usage, along with trying to stay up-to-date with beauty and fashion trends, could be damaging to those who already struggle with body image issues. This study researched the relationship between social media use and maladjustment, focusing on appearance-related content and symptoms of anxiety. They had two hypotheses, one being that appearance-related (AR) social media preoccupation would correlate with more symptoms of depression and social anxiety, and the other being that AR social media preoccupation use intensifies the use of social media with appearance anxiety. They used 763 adolescents of mixed genders from ages 12-17. They also tested college students from ages 16-25. The participants completed surveys that inquired about social media use, symptoms of general anxiety, appearance anxiety, and depression. They found that social media use can be associated with worse emotional adjustment in adolescents and young adults as well as that appearance-related social media preoccupation elevated symptoms of appearance anxiety. 

Further investigation has suggested that spending an excessive amount of time on social media can lead to depressive symptoms, which in turn may increase the risk for social isolation or even suicidal ideation. Many policymakers have expressed concerns regarding the potential negative impact of social media on mental health because of its relation to suicidal thoughts and ideation. A study conducted by Dr. Chloe Berryman and her coauthors looked into the phenomenon called “vague booking,” which refers to individuals intentionally wording their social media posts in a way that they believe will obtain concern from others. These posts may even function as a cry for help. This study found that young adults who partook in vague booking and relied on social media as their emotional outlet reported greater loneliness and suicidal thoughts than those who were not vague booking.

Social comparison theory examines how people establish their personal value by comparing themselves to others. These social comparisons and related feelings of jealousy, when made on social media platforms, can lead to the development of symptoms of depression in users. Depression is common also for children and adolescents who have been cyberbullied. According to Youth Risk Behavior Surveillance — United States, 2015, nationwide, 15.5% of students had been electronically bullied, counting being bullied through e-mail, chat rooms, instant messaging, websites, or texting, during the 12 months before the survey. Using 7 or more social media platforms has been correlated with a higher risk of anxiety and depression in adolescents.

Social media can significantly influence body image concerns in female adolescents. Young women who are easily influenced by the images of others on social media may hold themselves to an unrealistic standard for their bodies because of the prevalence of digital image alteration. Social media can be a gateway to Body dysmorphic disorder. Dana Johns, MD, a plastic surgeon at the University of Utah Health says, "Selfie' or 'Snapchat' dysmorphia is essentially the new age social media upgrade to a long-standing disorder." The current social media age we're inputs a new level of expectations for adolescents and how they should look.

Engaging with social media platforms two hours before falling asleep can affect sleep quality, and a longer duration of digital media use is associated with reduced total sleep time. The phenomena of "Facebook depression" is a condition which comes to surface when young adults have a higher usage of Facebook and tend to manifest the actual symptoms of depression. Youths who frequently use social media increase their risk of depression by 27 percent, while those who dedicate themselves to outdoor activities don't have that much risk. Sleep deprivation may also be another common factor in teens. According to the Mayo Clinic, a 2016 study that was conducted on more than 450 teens found that greater social media use, nighttime social media use, and emotional investment in social media, such as feeling upset when prevented from logging on, were each linked with worse sleep quality that could increase the levels of anxiety and depression.

Policymaking 
Although a large aspect of policymaking is creating or changing laws, this is not always the case. Policymaking can also include other types of established standards, for example, parents’ rules or policies restricting their child’s social media exposure. Since social media is easily accessible to nearly everyone, there are few laws regarding adolescents’ exposure to social media. However, there is substantial evidence that parents’ policies regarding the time their child spends on social media has an impact on their child’s mental health.

One particular study, conducted by Dr. Jasmine Fardouly and her coauthors, involved a sample of 528 preadolescent social media users between the ages of 10 and 12 and one of their parents. Both children and their parents completed online surveys. Some of the parents involved in the study enforced social media policies for their children, such as setting rules that limit the amount of time their child spent on social media. Results from this study showed that preadolescents with parents who had greater control over their child’s time on social media reported better overall mental health. The researchers found that parents who reduced the amount of time their child spent on social media resulted in their child being less exposed to content harmful to their emotional health. More parental control over time spent on social media was also found to be associated with preadolescents making fewer appearance comparisons online. The authors of this study concluded that fewer social media appearance comparisons were associated with higher adolescent appearance satisfaction and life satisfaction, as well as lower depressive symptoms.

See also
Instagram's impact on people

References

Social media